Painter Creek is an unincorporated community in Darke County, in the U.S. state of Ohio.

History
Painter Creek was platted in 1870. The community took its name from nearby Painter Creek. A post office called Painter Creek was established in 1852, and remained in operation until 1903. Besides the post office, Painter Creek had a tile factory, schoolhouse, and town hall.

References

Unincorporated communities in Darke County, Ohio
Unincorporated communities in Ohio